The 11th Annual American Music Awards were held on January 16, 1984. Michael Jackson was the big winner of the night, winning eight awards.

Performances

Winners and nominees

References
 http://www.rockonthenet.com/archive/1984/amas.htm

1984